Sir Charles David Read FRCS FRCSE FRACS (22 December 1902 – 21 August 1957) was a New Zealand surgeon who specialised in obstetrics, gynaecology and pathology after moving to the United Kingdom.

Early life and education 
Read was born in Woodlands, in the province of Southland, New Zealand to businessman Joseph James and Elizabeth Brown Read. Read attended Southland Boys' High School and Otago Boys' High School. In 1920 he entered Otago Medical School in Dunedin and graduated four years later.

Career 
In 1926, after completing a residency at Dunedin Hospital, Read went to London. He served as secretary and vice-president of the obstetrical division of the Royal Society of Medicine, and became President of the Royal College of Obstetricians and Gynaecologists in 1955.
He was an honorary member of the American Association of Obstetricians, Gynaecologists and Abdominal Surgeons, the American Gynaecological Society, the South African Association of Obstetricians and Gynaecologists, and the Athens Obstetrical and Gynaecological Society.

He edited the 5th edition of Edward Lockyer's Gynaecology with Douglas MacLeod, and he was engaged with MacLeod on a revision of Bonney's Textbook of Gynaecological Surgery.

He married twice, having two sons by each marriage. His first wife was Mabyn Gill, and his second wife was Dr F Edna Wilson, sister of the eminent Anglo-Irish surgeon T.G. Wilson.

Read died suddenly, aged 54, aboard his yacht on 21 August 1957. Lady Read died in 2003.

References

1902 births
1957 deaths
New Zealand surgeons
Knights Bachelor
Fellows of the Royal College of Surgeons
20th-century New Zealand people
People educated at Southland Boys' High School
People educated at Otago Boys' High School
20th-century surgeons